Louis Leon Thurstone (29 May 1887 – 29 September 1955) was an American pioneer in the fields of psychometrics and psychophysics. He conceived the approach to measurement known as the law of comparative judgment, and is well known for his contributions to factor analysis. A Review of General Psychology survey, published in 2002, ranked Thurstone as the 88th most cited psychologist of the 20th century, tied with John Garcia, James J. Gibson, David Rumelhart, Margaret Floy Washburn, and Robert S. Woodworth.

Background and history 
Louis Leon Thurstone was born in Chicago, Illinois, to Swedish immigrant parents. His family returned to Stockholm, Sweden, when he was eight years old, before returning to the United States in 1901, settling Jamestown, New York. [[James. Thurstone originally received a master's degree in mechanical engineering from Cornell University in 1912. Thurstone was offered a brief assistantship in the laboratory of Thomas Edison. In 1914, after two years as an instructor of geometry and drafting at the University of Minnesota, he enrolled as a graduate student in psychology at the University of Chicago (PhD, 1917). He later returned to the University of Chicago (1924–1952) where he taught and conducted research; among his students was James Watson, who co-discovered the structure of DNA. 1952, he established the L. L. Thurstone Psychometric Laboratory at the University of North Carolina at Chapel Hill.

Factor analysis and work on intelligence 
Thurstone was responsible for the standardized mean and standard deviation of IQ scores used today, as opposed to the Intelligence Test system originally used by Alfred Binet. He is also known for the development of the Thurstone scale.

Thurstone's work in factor analysis led him to formulate a model of intelligence centered on "Primary Mental Abilities" (PMAs), which were independent group factors of intelligence that different individuals possessed in varying degrees. He opposed the notion of a singular general intelligence that factored into the scores of all psychometric tests and was expressed as a mental age. In 1935 Thurstone, together with EL Thorndike and JP Guilford, founded the journal Psychometrika and also the Psychometric Society, going on to become the society's first president in 1936. Thurstone's contributions to methods of factor analysis have proved valuable in establishing and verifying later psychometric factor structures, and have influenced the hierarchical models of intelligence in use in intelligence tests such as WAIS and the modern Stanford-Binet IQ test.

The seven primary mental abilities in Thurstone's model were verbal comprehension, word fluency, number facility, spatial visualization, associative memory, perceptual speed, and reasoning.

Contributions to measurement 
Despite his contributions to factor analysis, Thurstone (1959, p. 267) cautioned: "When a problem is so involved that no rational formulation is available, then some quantification is still possible by the coefficients of correlation of contingency and the like. But such statistical procedures constitute an acknowledgement of failure to rationalize the problem and to establish functions that underlie the data. We want to measure the separation between the two opinions on the attitude continuum and we want to test the validity of the assumed continuum by means of its internal consistency". Thurstone's approach to measurement was termed the law of comparative judgment. He applied the approach in psychophysics, and later to the measurement of psychological values. The so-called 'Law', which can be regarded as a measurement model, involves subjects making a comparison between each of a number of pairs of stimuli with respect to magnitude of a property, attribute, or attitude. Methods based on the approach to measurement can be used to estimate such scale values.

Thurstone's Law of comparative judgment has important links to modern approaches to social and psychological measurement. In particular, the approach bears a close conceptual relation to the Rasch model (Andrich, 1978), although Thurstone typically employed the normal distribution in applications of the Law of comparative judgment whereas the Rasch model is a simple logistic function. Thurstone anticipated a key epistemological requirement of measurement later articulated by Rasch, which is that relative scale locations must 'transcend' the group measured; i.e. scale locations must be invariant to (or independent of) the particular group of persons instrumental to comparisons between the stimuli. Thurstone (1929) also articulated what he referred to as the additivity criterion for scale differences, a criterion which must be satisfied in order to obtain interval-level measurements.

Awards and honors 
Thurstone received numerous awards, including:  Best Article, American Psychological Association (1949); Centennial Award, Northwestern University (1951); Honorary Doctorate, University of Göteborg (1954). Thurstone was President of American Psychological Association (1933) and first President of the American Psychometric Society (1936). He was elected to the American Academy of Arts and Sciences in 1937, the United States National Academy of Sciences in 1938, and the American Philosophical Society in 1938.

Selected works 
 The Nature of Intelligence   (London:  Routledge. 1924)
 The Effect of Motion Pictures on the Social Attitudes of High School Children Ruth C. Peterson & L.L. Thurstone, MacMillan, 1932
 Motion Pictures and the Social Attitudes of Children Ruth C. Peterson & L.L. Thurstone, MacMillan, 1933
The Vectors of Mind. Address of the president before the American Psychological Association, Chicago meeting, September, 1933  ( Psychological Review, 41, 1–32. 1934)
 The Vectors of Mind (Chicago, IL, US: University of Chicago Press 1935)
Primary mental abilities  (Chicago: University of Chicago Press. 1938)
 Multiple-Factor Analysis (Chicago:  University of Chicago Press. 1947)
 The Fundamentals of Statistics (MacMillan: Norwood Press. 1925)

See also 
L. L. Thurstone Psychometric Laboratory
Law of comparative judgment

References

Sources

External links 
 The Vectors of Mind 1934
 History of  L. L. Thurstone Psychometric Laboratory

Cornell University College of Engineering alumni
University of Chicago alumni
Intelligence researchers
Fellows of the American Statistical Association
American people of Swedish descent
1887 births
1955 deaths
Presidents of the American Psychological Association
Members of the American Philosophical Society